The 2001 National AFL Under 18 Championships was the sixth edition of the AFL Under 18 Championships. Eight teams competed in the championships: Vic Metro, Vic Country, South Australia and Western Australia in Division 1, and New South Wales/Australian Capital Territory (NSW/ACT), Northern Territory, Queensland and Tasmania in Division 2. The competition was played over three rounds across two divisions. Vic Metro and Tasmania were the Division 1 and Division 2 champions, respectively. The Michael Larke Medal (for the best player in Division 1) was awarded jointly to Sam Power (Vic Metro) and Steven Armstrong (Western Australia), while the Hunter Harrison Medal (for the best player in Division 2) was won by Tasmania's Tom Davidson.

Under 18 All-Australian team
The 2001 Under 18 All-Australian team was named on 9 July 2001:

NSW/ACT
 Lewis Roberts-Thomson – NSW/ACT Rams
 Daniel Elstone – Bendigo Pioneers

Northern Territory
 Xavier Clarke – St Marys

Queensland
 David Hale – Broadbeach

South Australia
 Mark Jamar – North Adelaide

 Tasmania
 Nathan Street – Glenorchy
 Tom Davidson – Geelong Falcons
 Barry Brooks – Tassie Mariners

Victoria Country
 Ashley Watson – Bendigo Pioneers
 Jimmy Bartel – Geelong Falcons
 Mark McGough – Murray Bushrangers
 Steve Johnson – Murray Bushrangers

Victoria Metropolitan
 Andrew Carrazzo – Oakleigh Chargers
 Sam Power – Oakleigh Chargers
 Luke Ball – Sandringham Dragons
 David Rodan – Calder Cannons
 Charlie Gardiner – Sandringham Dragons
 Brent Reilly – Calder Cannons
 Ben Finnin – Northern Knights

Western Australia
 Craig Glancy – East Perth
 Steven Armstrong – Perth
 Quinten Lynch – West Perth

Coach
David Dickson (Vic Metro)

Assistant coach
Martin King (Tasmania)

References

Under 18